Andrew Clarke (born 9 February 1945) is a Trinidadian cricketer. He played in eight first-class matches for Trinidad and Tobago from 1966 to 1971.

See also
 List of Trinidadian representative cricketers

References

External links
 

1945 births
Living people
Trinidad and Tobago cricketers